Kalasi Vunte Kaladu Sukham is a 1961 Indian Telugu-language drama film, produced by Y. Rama Krishna Prasad and C. V. R. Prasad under Saradhi Studios and directed by Tapi Chanakya. It stars N. T. Rama Rao and Savitri, with music composed by Master Venu. The film is a remake of the Tamil film Bhaaga Pirivinai (1959). The film was a box office success.

Plot
The story revolves around a joint family; Pattabhiramaiah (S. V. Ranga Rao) and Sundara Ramaiah (Perumallu) are two brothers who live happily. Pattabhiramaiah and his wife Sowbhagyamma (Suryakantham) have no children while Sundara Ramaiah and Ramanamma (Hemalatha) are blessed with two sons, the elder Kishtaiah (NTR) at the age of seven is paralyzed in his left hand and leg due to an electric shock he has received while trying to retrieve a kite. Their second son Raghu (Haranath) is a college student. The kind-hearted Ramanamma shelters an orphan Radha (Savitri), who later becomes her daughter-in-law by marrying Kishtaiah. Sowbhagyamma's nephew "Rangoon" Raja (Relangi), a cheat, causes the division in the joint family and tricks his aunt to lend him a huge amount of money. He incites Raghu, who by then is married to his sister Janaki (Girija), to pilfer office money. Raja plans the "elephant and kid" feat in his circus and kidnaps Kishtaiah's child. While trying to save his son, Kishtaiah touches an electric wire and the shock therapy cures him. The culprits are brought to jail and the family is reunited.

Cast
N. T. Rama Rao as Kishtaiah
Savitri as Radha
S. V. Ranga Rao as Pattabhi Ramaiah
Haranath as Raghu Ram
Relangi as Rangoon Raja
Allu Ramalingaiah as Hanuman
Perumallu as Sundara Ramaiah 
Suryakantham as Sowbhagyam
Girija as Janaki
Hemalatha as Ramanamma 
Rama Devi
Padmini Priyadarshini as Anarkali

Soundtrack 

Music composed by Master Venu.

References

External links

1961 films
1960s Telugu-language films
Indian drama films
Telugu remakes of Tamil films
Indian black-and-white films
Films directed by Tapi Chanakya
1961 drama films
Films scored by Master Venu